Veerapandi block  is a revenue block of Salem district of the Indian state of Tamil Nadu. This revenue block consist of 25 panchayat villages. They are,
 Akkarapalayam
 Anaikuttapatti
 Ariyagoundampatti
 Chennagiri
 Ettimanickampatti
 Inambiroji
 Kadathur Agr.
 Kalparapatti
 Keerapappambadi
 Maramangalathupatti
 Marulayampalayam
 Mooduthurai
 Murungapatti
 Papparapatti
 Periya Seeragapadi
 Perumagoundampatti
 Perumampatti
 Poolavari
 Puthur Agr.
 Rajapalayam
 Rakkipatti
 Senaipalayam
 Uthamasolapuram
 Veerapandi
 Vembadithalam

References 

Revenue blocks of Salem district